Hey Babe! is a 1999 Filipino romantic comedy film released by Star Cinema directed by Joyce Bernal. It stars Jolina Magdangal and Marvin Agustin. This was the last love team movie with Magdangal and Agustin and also a spin-off of Labs Ko Si Babe.

Plot

Every Friday, Abigail (Jolina Magdangal) religiously consults Madame Lola (Gina Pareño), a fortune teller. The old shrewd lady takes advantage of Abigail’s extreme grip on superstition by giving her signs about the perfect man for her. Nelson (Marvin Agustin) also takes advantage on the situation and paid Madame Lola to give Abigail signs that would make her believe that he is the one for her. Eventually through Nelson’s perseverance, and Madame Lola’s bogus prediction, Abigail started to believe that Nelson is her Mr. Right. But there is no secret that remains uncover. Abigail learns about Nelson’s tricks hence her innocent love turns into a pure rage. It’s now Nelson’s turn to work things out and stop relying his luck to the make believe powers of cards and stars.

Cast

Main
 Jolina Magdangal as Abigail
 Marvin Agustin as Nelson
 Alma Moreno as Rose
 Gina Pareño as Madame Lola

Supporting
 Nikki Valdez as Queenie
 Dominic Ochoa as Jim
 Joey Marquez as Felipe
 Koko Trinidad as Lolo
 Roldan Aquino as Jose
 J.R. Herrera as Noel
 Bearwin Meily as Noli
 Mo Twister as Nito
 Monina Bagatsing as Ruby
 Justin Cuyugan as Marlon

Soundtrack

Hey Babe! is the soundtrack to the film and was released in 1999 by Star Music. It was awarded a gold record certification from the Philippine Association of the Record Industry.

Track listing

Personnel 
Adapted from the Hey Babe! Original Motion Picture Soundtrack liner notes.

 Dennis R. Quila – arranger (tracks 1, 4, 7, 10, 12)
 Tito Cayamanda – arranger (tracks 2, 3, 11)
 Arnold Buena – arranger (track 5)
 Marc Lopez – arranger (track 9)
 Noel Mendez – guitars (tracks 2, 3 4, 5, 11)
 Gerald Portacio – rap lyrics (track 10)
 Mo Twister – rap lyrics (track 10)
 Rico Blanco – remix (track 13)

References

External links

1999 romantic comedy films
1999 films
Star Cinema films
Philippine romantic comedy films
Films directed by Joyce Bernal